Maria Alves may refer to:

 Maria José Alves (born 1977), Brazilian paralympian 
 Maria Alves (footballer) (born 1993), Brazilian football (soccer) player
 Maria Alves (actress) (1947–2008), Brazilian actress
 Maria Alves (Portuguese actress) (1897–1926), Portuguese actress who was murdered
 Maria Domingas Alves (born 1959), women's rights activist and politician from East Timor
 Maria Fernanda Alves (born 1983), Brazilian tennis player
 Maria Clara Correia Alves, Portuguese feminist
Maria Alves (Lourdes Maria Assunção Alves Araújo) (1956–2021), women's rights activist and politician from East Timor